Flit (foaled 4 October 2016) is a Group 1 winning Australian thoroughbred racehorse.

Background
Flit was born and raised at Darley’s Northwood Park property in Seymour, Victoria.  She is sired by Champion stallion Medaglia d'Oro and is out of a Redoute's Choice mare named Glissade, who was Stakes placed as a 2 year old.

Racing career

2018/19: two-year-old season

Flit finished third at her first ever start in an 1100 metre maiden at Bendigo.  A month later she was successful in the Group 3 Thoroughbred Breeders Stakes, where she  finished a Dead heat winner.

2019/20 three-year-old season

After running placings in the Percy Sykes Stakes and the Silver Shadow Stakes, Flit started the 11/8 favourite in the Group 1 Thousand Guineas at Caulfield Racecourse.  Ridden by Hugh Bowman she won by the barest possible margin of a nose.

Resuming from a three month spell, Flit was successful in the Light Fingers Stakes at the odds of 10/1.  She defeated fellow Godolphin runners Lyre and Kiamichi to trifecta the race for the stable.

After unplaced runs in the Surround Stakes and All Star Mile, Flit finished second in the Arrowfield 3YO Sprint beaten by a nose margin.

2020/21 four-year-old season

Flit returned to racing after a four month break on 8 August in the Missile Stakes at Rosehill.  After looming up in the straight she was beaten 1 1/2 lengths into second place.

Flit would then have two unplaced runs in the Winx Stakes and Sheraco Stakes before contesting the Silver Eagle at Randwick on the 10 October 2020.  Flit settled in the back half of the field before finishing with a strong run to pass Alligator Blood and win by half a length.

Flit had her final race prior to becoming a broodmare when finishing unplaced behind Tofane in the 2021 Tattersall's Tiara

Pedigree

References 

Australian racehorses
Racehorses bred in Australia
Racehorses trained in Australia
2016 racehorse births